Sandymount High School was a coeducational secondary school on Herbert Road, Sandymount, Dublin 4 which operated for over 50 years before closing in 1999.

History
Sandymount High School was founded in 1947 and was initially controversial because, as a non-denominational school, it wasn't owned by a church but by the Cannon family, who also provided the two headmasters the school had: father and son Patrick and Conall Cannon. Patrick's wife Eileen Cannon also served as headmistress.

The school's student body included those from a local council estate called Beech Hill, the offspring of parents disenchanted with denominational/same sex schools, students on the Malahide/Howth to Bray rail corridor and foreign nationals who paid tuition fees.

While the school had a gym — basically exercise classes — for Intermediate Certificate students, it had no compulsory sports or sports team for a period. Otherwise rugby union was the main school sport for both Intermediate and Leaving Certificate male students during the early 1960s.

A rival school opened next door several years later: Marian College, run by the Catholic Church. It was originally intended to be co-educational and named Riverside College, but both the name and its co-educational character were changed at the insistence of John Charles McQuaid as he disliked the influence of Sandymount High.

The school was closed in 1999 and the land sold for development. The site now contains a gated community called Cannon Place.

Alumni
Notable former pupils include Fionnula Flanagan, Charlie Bird, Eamonn Dunphy, Dervla Kirwan and Ronnie Delaney.

References

Secondary schools in Dublin (city)
Sandymount
Ballsbridge
Educational institutions established in 1947
1947 establishments in Ireland
1999 disestablishments in Ireland
Educational institutions disestablished in 1999